Rajkumar Dhoot (born 11 September 1955) is a Member of Parliament (Rajya Sabha) representing the State of Maharashtra, India and ex-president of the Apex Indian Chamber of Commerce & Industry, ASSOCHAM (The Associated Chambers of Commerce and Industry of India). He is also the Promoter & Co-Owner of the diversified Videocon Group of Companies. He is a part of the Shiv Sena party. His father, the late Shri Nandlal Madhavlal Dhoot, was an Indian Industrialist and the founder of Videocon Group.

Early life 
Dhoot graduated with honors in commerce from S.B. College, Aurangabad.

Politics

Dhoot was first elected to the Rajya Sabha in April 2002 and served the Parliamentary Standing Committee on Finance, Consultative Committees for the Ministry of Commerce and Industry & the Ministry of Urban Development & Poverty Alleviation. He has been a regular member of the Consultative Committee of the Ministry of Finance & Special Invitee of the Consultative Committee for the Ministry of Communications & IT and for the Ministry of Petroleum & Natural Gas. He was a special invitee to the Consultative Committee for the Ministry of Information and Broadcasting (India). In April 2008, he was re-elected to Rajya Sabha for a second term & had been a Member of the Standing Committee on IT apart from being a Member of the Hindi Salahkar Samiti of the Ministry of Textiles. He was consecutively re-elected for a third term for the Rajya Sabha in 2014.

At present, he is a Member of the Standing Committee on Health & Family Welfare. He has introduced Private Members Bills in the Rajya Sabha. His areas of focus include the prevention of suicides of farmers of Maharashtra, the welfare of pavement dwellers and slum dwellers of Mumbai. He regularly writes to Union Ministers and Chief Minister of Maharashtra for the redressal of problems of Mumbai and rest of Maharashtra.

Dhoot, being a third-term senior Parliamentarian actively campaigned with his party chief Uddhav Thackeray and other Shiv Sena leaders in key cities of Maharashtra like Kolhapur, Nashik, Shirdi, Aurangabad, Ratnagiri amongst others before the General elections 2014 and also in the Maharashtra State Assembly Elections in 2014.

Dhoot, in the winter session of the Parliament in November 2014, introduced three bills - The Constitution (Amendment) Bill, 2014 (amendment of Article 371 on special provision with respect to the states of Maharashtra and Gujarat, The Illegal Immigrants and Missing Foreign Nationals Identification and Deportation Authority of India Bill, 2014, and The Homeless Pavement Dwellers (Welfare) Bill, 2014.

Chamber work and other interests

At the end of two terms as a Member of Parliament in the Rajya Sabha, Dhoot was elected as the President of Apex Industry body, The Associated Chambers of Commerce and Industry of India (ASSOCHAM) by its Managing Committee on 21 February 2012. He held this position till 19 July 2013 and was instrumental in leveraging the Apex Chambers’ contribution to the development of the Industry to a great degree, with several proactive and engaging events.

While Dhoot held office as the Senior Vice President of ASSOCHAM in 2011-12 and earlier was an active member of the Industry body, he also holds the unique distinction of being the first Parliamentarian to become the President of ASSOCHAM. Dhoot ended his tenure with the Annual event of ASSOCHAM in July 2013, which had the Prime Minister of India as the Chief Guest. Dhoot continues to be closely associated with ASSOCHAM as its Past President and plays an active role in its affairs.

Dhoot was president of Marathwada Industries Association, now Chamber of Marathwada Industries & Agriculture (CMIA) in 1994-95.

Philanthropy

Dhoot runs a leading multi-Super Specialty Charitable Hospital - ‘Nandlal Dhoot Charitable Hospital’ at Aurangabad with an investment of over ₹100 crores, and from primary to all tertiary level health care facilities to help the people suffering from critical and life-threatening conditions.

References

External links

Rajkumar Dhoot in ASSOCHAM
Dhoot on Indian Economy
PM's speech to India Inc
Rajkumar Dhoot's Interview with the Mint
Articles about Rajkumar Dhoot
Rajkumar Dhoot's Interview with The Hindu Business Line

Shiv Sena politicians
Rajasthani people
People from Rajasthan
Rajya Sabha members from Maharashtra
1955 births
Living people